The Granby Bisons were a Canadian junior ice hockey team based in Granby, Quebec, and played in the Quebec Major Junior Hockey League (QMJHL). They team was founded in 1981 in after the team moved from Sorel-Tracy, Quebec, where they had previously been known as the Sorel Éperviers. The Bisons played at Arena Leonard Grondin in Granby. In 1995 the team was renamed the Granby Prédateurs. As of 2019, the team is known as the Cape Breton Eagles. 

Notable former Bisons include Patrick Roy, Pierre Turgeon.

History
Georges Larivière was named head coach of the Bisons for the 1985–86 QMJHL season. His appointment was described by The Washington Post as "part of a bold experiment for the next two years" and as "part of a research project" for his work at the Université de Montréal.

Season-by-season record
 Granby Bisons (1981–1995)
 Granby Prédateurs (1995–1997)

OL = Overtime loss, Pct = Winning percentage

NHL alumni

Serge Aubin
Philippe Audet
Joel Baillargeon
Jesse Bélanger
Éric Bertrand
Philippe Boucher
François Breault
Martin Brochu
Marc Bureau
Alain Côté
Ed Courtenay
Xavier Delisle
Éric Desjardins
Jocelyn Gauvreau
Claude Houde
Daniel Lacroix
Christian Matte
Stéphane Quintal
André Racicot
Stéphane Richer
Marc Rodgers
Patrick Roy
Stéphane Roy
Everett Sanipass
Martin Simard
Pierre Turgeon

References

1981 establishments in Quebec
1995 disestablishments in Quebec
Defunct Quebec Major Junior Hockey League teams
Ice hockey clubs established in 1981
Sport in Granby, Quebec
Sports clubs disestablished in 1995